The 1993 Colonial Athletic Association baseball tournament was held at Brooks Field on the campus of UNC Wilmington in Wilmington, North Carolina, from May 19 through 23.  The event determined the champion of the Colonial Athletic Association for the 1993 season.  Third-seeded  won the tournament for the fifth time and earned the CAA's automatic bid to the 1993 NCAA Division I baseball tournament.

Entering the event, East Carolina had won the most championships, with four.  George Mason had won two and Richmond had won once.

Format and seeding
The CAA's six teams were seeded one to six based on winning percentage from the conference's round robin regular season.  As the CAA had seven teams, the last-place finisher, William & Mary, did not qualify for the tournament.  They played a double-elimination tournament.

Bracket and results

Most Valuable Player
Lyle Hartgrove was named Tournament Most Valuable Player.  Hartgrove was a pitcher for East Carolina.

References

Tournament
Colonial Athletic Association Baseball Tournament
Colonial Athletic Association baseball tournament
Colonial Athletic Association baseball tournament
College baseball tournaments in North Carolina
Baseball competitions in Wilmington, North Carolina